Sandhills Public Schools is a school district headquartered in Dunning, Nebraska. It operates elementary school, junior high, and senior high divisions.

The high school's main athletic rivalry was with Thedford High School in Thedford, but by 2009 the schools began sharing a single football team. The decline in agricultural labor in the United States caused a reduced number of residents in the towns and the lower proportions of children; this in turn resulted in lower enrollments in the two school districts.

References

External links
 Sandhills Public Schools
Blaine County, Nebraska
School districts in Nebraska